Ballen i øyet is a 2000 Norwegian comedy film directed by Catrine Telle, starring Laila Goody. Denise (Goody) is heavily short sighted, but still plays football. One day she is hit in the eye by a ball, and loses consciousness. When she wakes up, it seems that everyone else has an identical twin.

External links
 
 Ballen i øyet at Filmweb.no (Norwegian)
 Ballen i øyet at the Norwegian Film Institute

2000 films
2000 comedy films
Norwegian comedy films